Woodlawn Cemetery, Mausoleum & Mortuary, formerly Ballona Cemetery, is located at 1847 14th Street, alongside Pico Boulevard in Santa Monica, California, United States.  The cemetery is owned and operated by the city of Santa Monica. The cemetery has an eco-friendly section.

Notable burials
 Hugo Ballin (1879–1956), artist
 Mabel Ballin (1887–1958), actress
 George Bancroft (1882–1956), actor
 Jay Belasco (1888–1949), actor
 Ted Bessell (1935–1996), actor
 Charles Bickford (1891–1967), actor
 Barbara Billingsley (1915–2010), actress
 William Bishop (1918–1959), actor
 Roberts Blossom (1924–2011), actor
 Bonnie Bonnell (1905–1964), actress
 Edwina Booth (1904–1991), actress
 Edward Brophy (1895–1960), actor
 Leo Carrillo (1880–1961), actor and conservationist
 Henry Cuesta (1931–2003), musician
 Faye Dancer (1925–2002), professional baseball player
 Henry Daniell (1894–1963), actor
 Weston and Winston Doty (1913–1934), acting twins, drowned in a flood
 Cathy Downs (1924–1976), actress
 Vernon Duke (1893–1969), songwriter (later moved)
 Lion Feuchtwanger (1884–1958), author
 Paul Fix (1901–1983), actor
 Glenn Ford (1916–2006), actor
 Leland Ford (1893–1965), congressman
 Nicolás "Nick" Rolando Gabaldón Jr. (1927–1951), surfer 
 Ilka Grüning (1876–1964), actress
 William Haines (1900–1973), actor, interior designer
 Tom Hayden (1939–2016), Senator, activist, author, conservationist
 Paul Henreid (1908–1992), actor, director
 Phil Hill (1927–2008), race car driver
 Evelyn Hooker (1907–1996), psychologist
 Olaf Hytten (1888–1955), actor
 Abbot Kinney (1850–1920), real estate baron
 Harvey Korman (1927–2008), actor and comedian
 Henry Kuttner (1915–1958), author
 Florence Lake (1904–1980), actress
 Audra Lindley (1918–1997), actress

 Hughie Mack (1884–1927), actor
 Doug McClure (1935–1995), actor
 Micole Mercurio (1938–2016), actress
 Bess Myerson (1924–2014), actress, Miss America, political activist
 Red Norvo (1908–1999), jazz musician
 Lynne Overman (1887–1943), actor
 Christabel Pankhurst (1880–1958), British suffragette
 Jimmy Phipps (1950–1969), Vietnam Medal of Honor recipient
 James Poe (1921–1980), screenwriter
 Janos Prohaska (1919–1974), actor, stuntman
 Bill Raisch (1905–1984), actor
 Sally Ride (1951–2012), astronaut and physicist
 Blanche Robinson (1883–1969), pianist & composer
 Irene Ryan (1902–1973), actress and comedian
 Mitchell Ryan (1934–2022), actor
 Hayes "Big Ed" Sanders (1930–1954), Olympic boxing champion
 E. C. Segar (1894–1938), cartoonist, creator of "Popeye"
 Jimmie Shields (1905–1974), interior designer
 Hal Smith (1916–1994), actor who played Otis Campbell on The Andy Griffith Show
 May Sutton (1886–1975), U.S. and Wimbledon tennis champion
 Sándor Szabó (1906–1966), wrestler
 William Tuttle (1912–2007), make-up artist
 Jesse Unruh (1922–1987), politician and government official

References

External links

 
 

Cemeteries in Los Angeles County, California
Santa Monica, California